The Sumba eclectus, or Cornelia's eclectus (Eclectus cornelia) is a parrot species which is native to Sumba. Also larger than the Moluccan eclectus, the male is a paler shade of green overall and has a bluer tail. The female has an all red plumage, except for the primaries which are a dark royal blue, and can be differentiated from the Tanimbar eclectus by the lack of yellow to her tail.

Aviculture
The Sumba eclectus can be found in zoos and bird parks in Spain and Germany, although it is uncommon in wider aviculture.

References

Eclectus
Birds of Indonesia
Birds of Sumba
Birds described in 1850